Steve Helms is an American singer-songwriter and guitarist born in Cleburne, Texas. The title track from his Nowhere but Texas album is frequently played at University of Texas sporting events and Texas Rangers ball games. Helms is a board member of the Cowboys Who Care Foundation.

Discography
"Steve Helms Band" (2008)
"Nowhere but Texas" (2009)
"Red wine and Copenhagen" (2011)

References

External links

American country singer-songwriters
American country guitarists
American male guitarists
Living people
Year of birth missing (living people)
Country musicians from Texas
American male singer-songwriters
Singer-songwriters from Texas